Mary Frances Dawson, Countess of Dartrey, 24th Baroness de Ros of Helmsley (née FitzGerald-de Ros) (31 July 1854 – 4 May 1939), was a British peer. She was born in London. Her parents were The 23rd Baron de Ros and Lady Elizabeth Egerton. Upon her father's death in 1907, Mary succeeded to the title.

The 24th Baroness married Anthony Dawson, 3rd Earl of Dartrey (1855–1933), in London on 2 October 1878. To them were born three daughters; the Barony of de Ros descended among their issue:

Lady Una Mary Dawson (1879–1956), who became the 25th Baroness upon the termination of the abeyance in 1943.
Lady Maude Elizabeth Dawson (1882–?)
Lady Eleanor Charlotte Augusta Dawson (1885–?)

References
 "de Ros, Baron (Maxwell) (Baron E 1264)." Debrett's Peerage & Baronetage 1995. London: Debrett's Peerage Limited, 1995. pp. 362–363.

External links
 

25
Mary
Mary
British countesses
Daughters of barons
De Ros, Mary Dawson, 24th Baroness of
1854 births
1939 deaths